Berkeh Doka (also Romanized as Berkeh Dokā and Berkeh-ye Dokā’; also known as Berkeh Dokān, Berkeh Dūkūn, Berkeh-ye Dowkā, Berkeh-ye Dūkā’, Birkeh Dugān, Deh Gūn, and Dūkūn) is a village in Kushk-e Nar Rural District, Kushk-e Nar District, Parsian County, Hormozgan Province, Iran. At the 2006 census, its population was 800, in 139 families.

References 

Populated places in Parsian County